Natalya Pasichnyk (Ukrainian: Наталя Пасічник), born February 13, 1971, is a Swedish-Ukrainian classical pianist. She lives in Stockholm.

Biography 
Born in Rivne, Ukraine, Natalya is the daughter of Igor and Jadwiga (née Antonovich) Pasichnyk. Her father became the first rector of National University of Ostroh Academy when it was revived in 1994. Her sister is the soprano Olga Pasichnyk.

Natalya started her musical studies at the age of three. After graduating from the Music Boarding School in Lviv she continued at the Lviv National Musical Academy, M. Lysenko for professor Josef Örmeny. She then finished her postgraduate studies for professor Andrzej Stefański at the Chopin University of Music in Warsaw and for Staffan Scheja at the Royal Swedish Academy of Music.

Natalya has performed widely, both as soloist and accompanying her sister Olga. She has appeared throughout Europe, USA, and Japan, in concert halls such as Suntory Hall (Tokyo), Berwaldhallen (Stockholm), Konserthuset (Stockholm), deSingel (Antwerp), Auditori Winterthur (Barcelona), Laeiszhalle (Hamburg), and in the major Polish concert halls., at festivals such as Beethoven-festival and Mozart festival, La Folle Journée de Varsovie, Gdansk Piano Autumn (Poland), Schubertiada (Spain), Palaces of St. Petersburg (Russia). She cooperated with the Swedish Radio Symphony Orchestra, Mozarteum (Germany), Orchestre d'Auvergne (France), Philharmonic Orchestra of Kraków, Wrocław, Gdańsk and Poznań (Poland), NorrlandsOperan  (Sweden) under the direction of conductors such as Christopher Hogwood, Evgeniy Svetlanov, Arie van Beck, Jacek Kaspszyk, Marek Mos, B Tommy Andersson, and Robert Stehli.
She is prizewinner of the Fifth Nordic Piano Competition in Nyborg (Denmark, 1998), and the World Piano Competition in Cincinnati (USA, 1999). In 2017 she was awarded Stockholm city's culture grant, based on her contribution to Stockholm’s cultural life.

Discography 
 Consolation – Forgotten Treasures of the Ukrainian Soul (BIS records, 2016)
 The Fourth Dimension (Musicon, 2005) – Bach and Messiaen
 Musik i Giresta kyrka (True Track production, 2000)
 Mozart, W. A.: Concert Arias ("Bella mia fiamma ...") (CD Accord, 2012)
 Chopin – complete songs (NAXOS, 2010)
 Wolfgang Amadeus Mozart – Complete songs (Pro Musica Camerata, 2006)
 Felix Mendelssohn-Bartholdy | Antonin Dvorak (Pro Musica Camerata, 2003)
 Dumky – Popular Ukrainian songs for voice and piano (OPUS111, 2001)

References

External links 
 
 

1971 births
Living people
Musicians from Rivne
Swedish classical pianists
Swedish women pianists
Ukrainian classical pianists
Ukrainian women pianists
21st-century classical pianists
Women classical pianists
21st-century women pianists